Coltsfoot Rock is a confectionery product created from coltsfoot extract by the UK confectioners Stockley's Sweets, based in Oswaldtwistle, Lancashire, England. As a product, it is a hardened stick of brittle rock candy flavoured with coltsfoot.

Coltsfoot rock has gained acknowledgements from the UK Regional Tourism Board, Lancashire Tourism Council and culinary organisations such as Gourmet Britain.

The recipe is secret to Stockley's Sweets and, as they are the only manufacturer, all products that are labelled as such have originated from Stockley's traditional factory.

The history and popularity of the confectionery comes from its supposed medicinal benefits; originally the leaves of the coltsfoot plant were dried and then smoked, and this was thought to have relieved asthma.

References

External links 
 Stockley's Sweets - The creators and only manufacturer of Coltsfoot Rock
 Stockley's Sweets page on the Gourmet Britain website

British confectionery
Candy